Prince of Orange Mall is a regional enclosed shopping mall in Orangeburg, South Carolina, United States.  It is located on the northern end of town, at the edge of the city limits.  The current anchor tenant is Belk. The JCPenney anchor store closed in 2020, while the Sears anchor closed in 2013. The fourth anchor, Key Catalog Showroom, was demolished in 2015.

Background
The mall was built in 1984 by Orangeburg Associates. They sold it to National Property Analysts in 1986.

Hull Storey Gibson Companies, a regional owner of shopping malls, purchased the mall in 1998 when it was in foreclosure.  At that point, the food court had no tenants and the mall was only at 70 percent occupancy.  The mall was subsequently renovated and occupancy increased.

The mall is named after William IV, Prince of Orange, for which the town is also named.

On June 4, 2020, JCPenney announced that it would close around October 2020 as part of a plan to close 154 stores nationwide. After JCPenney closed, Belk is the one and only remaining anchor store left.

References

Shopping malls in South Carolina
Buildings and structures in Orangeburg County, South Carolina
Shopping malls established in 1984
Hull Property Group
1984 establishments in South Carolina